Lei Diansheng (simplified Chinese: 雷殿生) is a Chinese explorer who hiked a total distance of 81,000 km over ten years, covering all of China's provinces.

Biography 
Lei was born in Harbin, Heilongjiang Province. Both of his parents died when he was a child.

Inspired by the 17th-century travel writer Xu Xiake, Lei embarked on a decade-long hike throughout China, starting in October 1998 in Harbin and ending in October 2008 in Lop Nur, Xinjiang Province. He became the first person to traverse Lop Nur on foot alone. In the last year of his journey, Lei carried the Olympic flame ahead of the 2008 Summer Olympics. Lei recorded his exploits in a book titled 十年徒步中国 (Ten Years of Hiking Across China).

References 

Chinese explorers
People from Harbin
Living people
Year of birth missing (living people)